Wattipally is a remote village in  Telkapalle mandal, Nagar Kurnool Revenue division of Nagarkurnool district, Andhra Pradesh, India.

References 

Villages in Nagarkurnool district